Matthew Robbins (born July 15, 1945) is an American screenwriter and film director best known for his writing work within the American New Wave movement.

He collaborated with numerous filmmakers within the movement including George Lucas, Walter Murch and Steven Spielberg, on films like The Sugarland Express, Close Encounters of the Third Kind, and Jaws. He has also worked frequently with Guillermo del Toro, writing his films Mimic, Crimson Peak and Pinocchio. Robbins has frequently worked with writer Hal Barwood.

Prior to attending USC School of Cinematic Arts, Robbins graduated from Johns Hopkins University in 1965 where he was classmate and friends with Walter Murch and Caleb Deschanel. He is a graduate of the AFI Conservatory. In 2004, Robbins received a Distinguished Alumnus Award from Johns Hopkins.

In 2011, he made his debut in Indian cinema by penning the screenplay for the Bollywood thriller 7 Khoon Maaf, along with Vishal Bhardwaj. His second Indian film Rangoon, was helmed by the same director.

Filmography

Uncredited writer
Electronic Labyrinth: THX 1138 4EB (1967, short film)
THX 1138 (1971, also cameo as "THX 1138 in end scene")
 Jaws (1975)
 Close Encounters of the Third Kind (1977, also second unit director and cameo as "Returnee #3 Flt. 19")

Awards and nominations 
 1974 Cannes Film Festival Award for Best Screenplay: The Sugarland Express (won)
 1974 Writers Guild of America Award for Best Comedy Written Directly for the Screen: The Sugarland Express (nomination)
 1976 Writers Guild of America Award for Best Comedy Adapted from Another Medium: The Bingo Long Traveling All-Stars & Motor Kings (nomination)
 1981 Hugo Award for Best Dramatic Presentation: Dragonslayer (nomination)
 1997 Saturn Award for Best Writing: Mimic (nomination)
 2010 César Award for Best Original Screenplay: Le Concert (nomination)
 2015 Saturn Award for Best Writing: Crimson Peak (nomination)

References

External links
 

Living people
1945 births
AFI Conservatory alumni
Johns Hopkins University alumni
USC School of Cinematic Arts alumni
20th-century male writers
21st-century American male writers
American film directors
American film producers
American male screenwriters
21st-century American screenwriters
Cannes Film Festival Award for Best Screenplay winners